Aitne may refer to:

Aitne (moon), one of Jupiter's moons
Aetna (nymph), or Aitne, in Greek mythology

See also
Aetna (disambiguation)